Alexandre Silva (Portuguese spelling) may refer to:
Alexandre da Silva, known as Guga (born 1964), Brazilian footballer
Alexandre Alves da Silva (born 1981), Brazilian footballer
Alexandre Afonso da Silva (born 1983), Brazilian footballer
Alexandre Jansen Da Silva (born 1987), Belgian footballer
Alexandre Nascimento Costa Silva (born 1997), Portuguese footballer
Alexandre Duarte Silva (born 1983), Brazilian footballer
Alexandre Rodrigues da Silva, known as Alexandre Pato, Brazilian footballer
 Alexandre da Silva Mariano, known as Amaral (born 1973), Brazilian footballer
 Alexandre da Silva, known as Chiquinho (born 1974), Brazilian footballer

Alessandro da Silva (Italian spelling) may refer to:
Alessandro Alvares da Silva (born 1970), former Brazilian footballer
Alessandro Viana da Silva (born 1982), Brazilian footballer

Alex da Silva may refer to:
Alex da Silva (born 1981), Brazilian footballer 
Alex Da Silva (dancer) (born 1968), Brazilian-born, LA-based salsa dancer
Alex da Silva Coelho (born 1996), Brazilian mixed martial artist

Alex Silva may refer to:
Alex Sandro da Silva (born 1985), Brazilian footballer 
Alex William Costa e Silva (born 1988), Brazilian footballer
Alex Silva (wrestler) (born 1990), Canadian professional wrestler Alexandre Freitas
Alex Silva (footballer, born 1993), Uruguayan footballer 
Alex Silva (footballer, born 1994), Brazilian footballer
Alex Silva (footballer, born 1990), Uruguayan footballer